Gloria Lynne (born Gloria Wilson; November 23, 1929 – October 15, 2013), also known as Gloria Alleyne, was an American jazz vocalist with a recording career spanning from 1958 to 2007.

Early life
Lynne was born in Harlem in 1929 to John and Mary Wilson, a gospel singer. She grew up in Harlem, and as a young girl, Lynne sang with the local African Methodist Episcopal Zion Church Choir.

Career 
At the age of 15, she won first prize at the Amateur Night contest at the Apollo Theater. She shared the stage with contemporary night club vocal ensembles, and recorded as part of such groups as the Enchanters and the Dell-Tones in the 1950s. As a soloist she recorded under her birth name, although most of her work was released under her stage name on the Everest, with whom she signed in 1958, and Fontana labels.

Although showing much promise early on, especially after TV appearances, including the Harry Belafonte Spectacular, her development suffered through poor management. Some unscrupulous recording executives profited while she was had limited financial resources—a victim of unpaid royalties—and only saved by the fact that she was able to work steadily and earn her money from live performances.

During her earlier years on the road, Lynne shared bills with RnB, jazz, traditional pop music, and pop singers  including Ray Charles, Billy Eckstine, Johnny Mathis and Ella Fitzgerald. TV specials include two with Harry Belafonte. She wrote lyrics for "Watermelon Man" with Herbie Hancock, and "All Day Long" with Kenny Burrell. Her final recording was "I Wish It Would Snow" featuring Bucky Pizzarelli. The song was featured in the 2014 Lifetime movie Seasons of Love, starring Gladys Knight and Taraji P. Henson.

New York City proclaimed July 25, 1995 as "Gloria Lynne Day."

Personal life
She and her husband, Harry Alleyne, had a son, Richard. Gloria and Richard Alleyne ran a production company, Family Bread Music Inc.

She died of a heart attack on October 15, 2013, in Newark, New Jersey, at the age of 83.

Awards
In 1996, Lynne received the International Women of Jazz Award, and she was honored with a Pioneer Award by the Rhythm and Blues Foundation in 1997. Other awards and recognition include the National Treasure Award from the Seasoned Citizens Theatre Company (2003); induction into the National Black Sports and Entertainment Hall of Fame; Living Legend Award from the State of Pennsylvania (2007). In 2008, Lynne was presented with a special award for "Outstanding Achievement In Jazz", at the New York MAC Awards. In 2010, she was honored at New York's Schomburg Library, for her many contributions to the music industry and the world by Great Women In Music and its founder Roz Nixon. Roz Nixon Entertainment worked successfully with Lynne throughout her final years, producing, co-producing or participating in making the arrangements for Ms. Lynne's appearances pertaining to her last concerts or significant events.

Charted singles

Discography

As a member of the Dell Tones

Singles

Albums

References

External links
 

  at Soulfulkindamusic.com
  at Verve Records
  at Afrocentricnews.com

1929 births
2013 deaths
American women jazz singers
American jazz singers
Singers from New York City
Smash Records artists
Muse Records artists
Jazz musicians from New York (state)
HighNote Records artists
21st-century American women
Methodists from New York (state)
20th-century Methodists
21st-century Methodists